West Dorset is a constituency represented in the House of Commons of the UK Parliament since 2019 by Chris Loder, a Conservative.

History
The seat was created under the Redistribution of Seats Act 1885.
Political history
Only Conservative MPs have been elected in West Dorset. Historically there have mostly been large majorities; thus the seat can be considered a safe seat. The closest result in recent years was in 2001, when the then member, Oliver Letwin, only just held his seat, with a majority of 2.8% over the Liberal Democrat candidate, Simon Green. The Liberal Democrats have come second at every election since 1974. Labour's best results in the constituency were in 1945 and 1966.

Prominent frontbenchers
Oliver Letwin, with a settled background in policy formulation, was appointed Minister of State for Policy (a Cabinet Office role) in the Conservative-Liberal Democrat Coalition on 12 May 2010. He had previously served as Shadow Chancellor of the Exchequer between 2003 and 2005.

Boundaries

1885–1918: The Municipal Boroughs of Bridport and Lyme Regis, the Sessional Divisions of Bridport and Cerne, and part of the Sessional Divisions of Dorchester and Sherborne.

1918–1950: The Municipal Boroughs of Bridport, Dorchester, and Lyme Regis, the Rural Districts of Beaminster, Bridport, Cerne, and Dorchester, and part of the Rural District of Weymouth.

1950–1974: The Municipal Boroughs of Bridport, Dorchester, and Lyme Regis, the Urban District of Sherborne, the Rural Districts of Beaminster, Bridport, and Sherborne, and part of the Rural District of Dorchester.

1974–1983: As 1950 but with redrawn boundaries.

1983–present: The District of West Dorset except the ward of Owermoigne.

The West Dorset constituency covers most of the West Dorset district and includes the towns of Dorchester, the county town of Dorset; Bridport, Lyme Regis and Beaminster to the west; and Sherborne to the north.

Constituency profile
Aside from tourist areas, including the Jurassic Coast which is a UNESCO World Heritage Site, the seat draws on managerial and advanced professional skills in sectors such as mechanical engineering, manufacturing, reconditioning, defence, art and design, which support local trades and retail. A slightly greater than average proportion of people are retired. Workless claimants who were registered jobseekers were in November 2012 significantly lower than the national average of 3.8%, at 1.4% of the population based on a statistical compilation by The Guardian.

Members of Parliament

Elections

Elections in the 2010s

Elections in the 2000s

Elections in the 1990s

Elections in the 1980s

Elections in the 1970s

Elections in the 1960s

Elections in the 1950s

Elections in the 1940s 

General Election 1939–40:

Another general election was required to take place before the end of 1940. The political parties had been making preparations for an election to take place from 1939, and by the end of this year the following candidates had been selected: 
Conservative: Simon Wingfield Digby
Liberal: George Edwin Chappell
British Union: Ralph Jebb

Elections in the 1930s

Elections in the 1920s

Elections in the 1910s 

General Election 1914–15:

Another General Election was required to take place before the end of 1915. The political parties had been making preparations for an election to take place and by July 1914, the following candidates had been selected: 
Unionist: Robert Williams
Liberal:

Elections in the 1900s

Elections in the 1890s

Elections in the 1880s

See also
 List of parliamentary constituencies in Dorset

Notes

References

Parliamentary constituencies in Dorset
Constituencies of the Parliament of the United Kingdom established in 1885